Showtime is the third and final studio album by German pop group Bro'Sis. It was released on 30 August 2004 by Cheyenne Records, Polydor and Zeitgeist.

Track listing

Charts

References

2004 albums
Bro'Sis albums
Polydor Records albums